Señorita República Dominicana 1984 was held on July 18, 1983. There were 18 candidates who competed for the national crown. The winner represented the Dominican Republic at the Miss Universe 1984 . The Señorita República Dominicana Mundo entered Miss World 1984.  The Señorita República Dominicana Café entered Reinado Internacional del Café 1984.  Only the 27 province, 1 municipality entered.  On the top 10 they showed their evening gown and answered questions so they could go to the top 5. In the top 5 they would answer more questions.

Results

Delegates

Azua - Dinorah Fuentes
Dajabón - Teresa Espaillat
Distrito Nacional - Delfina Taveras 
Distrito Nacional - Luz del Pilar Marte
Distrito Nacional - María Altagracia Tavarez Aristy
Distrito Nacional - Mary Angeles
Distrito Nacional - Sagris Zapete
Independencia - Ana del Rosario
La Vega - Rosanna Álvarez
Peravia - Amarilys Álvarez
Puerto Plata - Sumaya Alejandrina Heinsen Pérez
San Cristóbal - Marisol Carol Serret Cornielle
San Pedro de Macorís - Ana Carina Bencosme
Santiago - María del Carmen Caba
Santiago - Ninoska Rivas
Santiago Rodríguez - Cristina de Lara
Monsenor Nouel -  Mayelinne Ynes De Lara Almanzar
Valverde - Casandra Valdez Rodríguez

External links
 https://web.archive.org/web/20090211102742/http://ogm.elcaribe.com.do/ogm/consulta.aspx

Miss Dominican Republic
1984 beauty pageants
1984 in the Dominican Republic